"The God That Failed" is a song by American heavy metal band Metallica, released from their 1991 self-titled album (often called as "the Black Album"). The song was never released as a single, but was the first of the album's songs to be heard by the general public. It is one of Metallica's first original releases to be tuned a half step down.

Composition and recording
Composer and lyricist James Hetfield described the song as "very nice... Slow, heavy and ugly." Lead guitarist Kirk Hammett recalls the inception of his solo in the song: "I had this whole thing worked out, but it didn't fit because the lead was too bluesy for the song, which is characterized by real heavy riffing and chording." According to Hammett, he and producer Bob Rock worked out his guitar solo on the song. Together they composed a melody to which Hammett wanted to add harmony. The producer suggested that this would make the song sound too "pretty", and instead recommended playing the melody an octave higher. The final guitar solo was put together from over a dozen performances by the guitarist during the recording of the album. Hammett calls the resulting work one of his favorite solos on the album.

Meaning
The central theme of the song is faith and human reliance on it, and of unrewarded belief in a God that fails to heal. The lyrics and song material were inspired by Hetfield's anguish on the circumstances surrounding his mother's death. She died of cancer after refusing medical attention, solely relying on her belief in God to heal her. Hetfield felt that had she not followed her Christian Science beliefs, she could have survived.

Baylor University Assistant Professor of Religion, Paul Martens points out that the song has been admired by some anti-religious groups, such as the websites "Alabama Atheist" and "The Secular Web". Martens notes, however, that Hetfield does not celebrate God's failure in the song, but instead blames God, through his mother's faith and death, for contributing to the meaninglessness of life.

Covers
In 2010, Finntroll covered this song and it's included on the limited edition of Nifelvind.
In 2012, Black Spiders covered this song for the Kerrang! album Kerrang! Presents Metallica The Black Album Covered.
In 2021, Idles and Imelda May covered this song for The Metallica Blacklist

Personnel

Metallica 
 James Hetfield - lead vocals, rhythm guitar
 Kirk Hammett - lead guitar
 Jason Newsted - bass, backing vocals
 Lars Ulrich - drums, percussion

Live performance
The song was first played on the first date of the Shit Hits the Sheds Tour (May 30, 1994). It was played in E flat tuning from 1994 to 2006 - since 2010, the song has been played in D standard tuning. It received frequent live performance during the 2012 European Black Album Tour when it was played as a part of the Black Album.

References

Further reading

Metallica songs
1991 songs
Songs critical of religion
Songs about death
Songs inspired by deaths
Songs written by James Hetfield
Songs written by Lars Ulrich
Song recordings produced by Bob Rock
Black Spiders songs
Finntroll songs